Michael Earls, S.J. (1875–1937) was a Jesuit priest, as well as a writer, poet, teacher, and administrator.

Life
The eldest of ten children, he was born in 1875 to Irish immigrant parents, Martin Earls and Mary (Shaughnessy) Earls, in Southbridge, Massachusetts, a manufacturing town in south, central Massachusetts.

He attended school in Southbridge and later prepared for college at Memramcook, near St. John’s New Brunswick.  He entered College of the Holy Cross in Worcester, Mass. in 1893, beginning what would be a long  association with one of the first Catholic colleges in the U.S., graduating with an A.B.

He studied literature at Georgetown University from 1896–1897, earning an MA and then served as a tutor on a trip to Europe, after which, in 1898, he entered the Grand Seminary at Montreal, Canada.

He later decided to attend the Jesuit novitiate at Frederick, Maryland. He taught at Boston College High School, was affiliated with the school literary magazine, and produced a play.  He returned to Woodstock and was ordained in 1912.

He was Professor of Rhetoric at Holy Cross from 1916 to 1926, Father Minister of the community from 1926–1929, and taught English from 1929 to 1931. In addition to these academic roles, he also held a number of other church positions, including parish priest at St. Mary’s in Boston’s North End from 1933 to 1935.

Over the course of his life, he was frequently drawn to leading literary figures and counted among his friends and correspondents Louise Imogen Guiney, Joyce Kilmer, and G. K. Chesterton.

As director of the Holy Cross Alumni Association, he was struck by a heart attack in New York City while boarding a train to Cleveland. He died at St. Vincent’s hospital on January 31, 1937.

He is memorialized by a stained glass window at the Dinand Library of Holy Cross College.

Works

Poetry
The Hosting of the King
The Road Beyond the Town (1912)
Ballads of Childhood
Ballads of Peace in War
From Bersabee to Dan
In the Abbey of the Woods

Short stories
Melchior of Boston
Stuore

Novels
Wedding Bells of Glendalough
Marie of the House d`Anters

Essays
Under College Towers
Manuscripts and Memories

References

Kuzniewski, Anthony J.,  Thy Honored Name: A History of the College of the Holy Cross, 1843-1994 (Catholic University of America Press, 1999)
The Record of an American Priets: Michael Earls, S.J., 1873–1937, American Ecclesiastical Review, 1957

External links
 
 
 
 
 Google Books (scanned copy) Manuscripts and Memories 

Georgetown University Graduate School of Arts and Sciences alumni
19th-century American Jesuits
20th-century American Jesuits
1875 births
1937 deaths
College of the Holy Cross alumni
People from Southbridge, Massachusetts